Katherine Paston, Lady Paston (1578 – 10 March 1629) was an English gentlewoman, estate manager and letter writer.

Origins

She was born as Katherine Knyvett, baptised in Ashwellthorp on 22 June 1578, a daughter of Thomas Knyvett, 4th Baron Berners by his wife Muriel Parry. Her sister Muriel Knyvett married Sir Edmond Bell, as his second wife.

Marriage and issue
On 28 April 1603 she married Edmund Paston and in 1610 on the death of his grandfather they moved into his ancestral seat of Paston Hall in Paston, Norfolk. They had two sons. The Paston's hold on their inheritance was confused as her husband's grandfather, Sir William Paston, had placed his estate in a trust because his heir, Christopher Paston, was mentally ill having been declared insane in 1609. They were granted £800 a year income from the trust. Her husband was "sickley" so in order to resolve the legal disputes she moved to London with her two sons in order to progress their case through the chancery courts.

Letters
Many of her letters survive, forming part of the famous Paston Letters. She wrote many letters including to her husband's brother in law Sir John Heveningham. Informative letters were also written to her son William Paston,  whom "she hopes is learning about both human and divine knowledge at university". Her letters remind her son of his responsibilities and of the importance of the church. Her son was 14 when he started at Cambridge University, also attended by his first cousins Edmund and Robert Bell, sons of Muriel Bell, Katherine's sister. In 1941 the Norfolk Record Society published her correspondence.

Death
She died in 1629 and was survived by her husband. Her elaborate monument with semi-recumbent effigy, made by Nicholas Stone, survives in St Margaret's Church, Paston.

References

1578 births
1629 deaths
People from Ashwellthorpe and Fundenhall
British reporters and correspondents
Knyvet family